HMS Cleveland (L46) was a Type I Hunt-class destroyer of the Royal Navy built by Yarrow Shipbuilders of Scotstoun, and launched on 24 April 1940. She was adopted by the civil community of Middlesbrough then in the North Riding of Yorkshire, as part of the Warship Week campaign in 1942.

Service history
On commissioning in 1940, she completed work ups for service in home waters, both the North Sea and the English Channel, which continued throughout 1941 and 1942. During April 1943, she was nominated for service in the Mediterranean. During that year, she provided cover for the Allied landings in Italy on Sicily (Operation Husky) and at Salerno (Operation Avalanche). During 1944, she was again deployed in the Mediterranean and in the Aegean Sea.

On 29 September 1945, Cleveland steamed from Gibraltar to Devonport and was placed in reserve. She was sold for scrapping and was wrecked at Llangennith, Glamorgan, Wales, on 28 June 1957 while under tow to Llanelli, for scrapping. The wreck was stripped and blown up on 14 December 1959.

References

Publications

External links
 Profile on naval-history.net

 

Hunt-class destroyers of the Royal Navy
Ships built on the River Clyde
1940 ships
World War II destroyers of the United Kingdom
Maritime incidents in 1957
Maritime incidents in 1959
Shipwrecks of Wales